The 2018 Tyrolean state election was held on 25 February 2018 to elect the members of the Landtag of Tyrol.

The conservative Austrian People's Party (ÖVP) placed first with 44.3% of votes, a 4.9 percentage point swing. The centre-left Social Democratic Party of Austria (SPÖ) recovered somewhat from its worst ever result in 2013, rising 3.5 points to 17.2%. The Freedom Party of Austria (FPÖ) also made gains. The Greens took small losses, while Citizens' Forum Tyrol (FRITZ) stayed level. NEOS – The New Austria (NEOS) contested its first state election in Tyrol, debuting at 5.2%. Forward Tyrol, which won 9.5% in 2013, did not contest the election.

Background
In the 2013 election, the ÖVP suffered its worst ever result in a Tyrolean state election, winning just 39.4%; prior to 2008, the party had always held a majority in the Landtag. The party subsequently formed a coalition with the Greens, who had achieved their best ever result in Tyrol at 12.6%.

Electoral system
The 36 seats of the Landtag of Tyrol are elected via open list proportional representation in a two-step process. The seats are distributed between nine multi-member constituencies, corresponding to the districts of Tyrol. For parties to receive any representation in the Landtag, they must either win at least one seat in a constituency directly, or clear a 5 percent state-wide electoral threshold. Seats are distributed in constituencies according to the Hare quota, with any remaining seats allocated using the D'Hondt method at the state level, to ensure overall proportionality between a party's vote share and its share of seats.

Contesting parties
The table below lists parties represented in the previous Landtag.

Forward Tyrol, which contested the previous election and won 9.5% of votes and four seats, did not contest the 2018 election.

In addition to the parties already represented in the Landtag, three parties collected enough signatures to be placed on the ballot.

 NEOS – The New Austria (NEOS)
 Family – The Tyrolean Family Party (FAMILY)
 Impulse Tyrol (IMPULS) – on the ballot in all constituencies except Schwaz

Opinion polling

Results

Results by constituency

Aftermath
The ÖVP held exploratory discussions with all other parties, narrowing their options to the SPÖ and Greens after the first round of talks. On 8 March, Governor Platter announced formal negotiations with the Greens would take place. On 20 March, they announced they had come to a coalition agreement. The government subsequently took office for a second term.

References

External links

Tyrol (state)
State elections in Austria
2018 elections in Austria
February 2018 events in Austria